The Twenty-first Amendment of the Constitution of India, officially known as The Constitution (Twenty-first Amendment) Act, 1967, amended the Eighth Schedule to the Constitution so as to include Sindhi as one of the languages, thereby raising the total number of languages listed in the schedule to fifteen. The Eighth Schedule lists languages that the Government of India has the responsibility to develop.

The Eighth Schedule to the Constitution originally included 14 languages. The 71st Amendment, enacted in 1992, included three more languages, i.e. Konkani, Meitei (Manipuri) and Nepali. The 92nd Amendment, added Bodo, Dogri, Santhali and Maithali in 2003, raising the total number of languages to 22.

Text

Proposal and enactment
The Constitution (Twenty-first Amendment) Bill, 1967 (Bill No. 1 of 1967) was introduced in the Rajya Sabha on 20 March 1967. It was introduced by Yashwantrao Chavan, then Minister of Home Affairs, and sought to amend the Eighth Schedule to the Constitution to include Sindhi as one of the languages listed in the schedule. The full text of the Statement of Objects and Reasons appended to the bill is given below:

The Bill was considered by the Rajya Sabha on 4 April 1967 and passed in the original form on the same day. The Bill, as passed by the Rajya Sabha, was considered and passed by the Lok Sabha on 7 April 1967. The bill received assent from then President Zakir Hussain on 10 April 1967. It was notified in The Gazette of India and came into force on the same date.

See also
List of amendments of the Constitution of India

References

21
1967 in India
1967 in law
Languages of India
Indira Gandhi administration